Linie may refer to:
 Linie, Greater Poland Voivodeship
 Linie, West Pomeranian Voivodeship